Sussex is a borough in Sussex County, in the U.S. state of New Jersey. As of the 2020 United States census, the borough's population was 2,024, a decrease of 106 (−5.0%) from the 2010 census count of 2,130, which in turn reflected a decline of 15 (−0.7%) from the 2,145 counted in the 2000 census.

Sussex was incorporated as a borough by an act of the New Jersey Legislature on October 14, 1891, as Deckertown, from portions of Wantage Township. The borough's original name was for settler Peter Decker. The borough was renamed Sussex on March 2, 1902. The county and borough are named for the historic county of Sussex in England.

A joint commission of residents of both Sussex and Wantage had recommended that the two communities should be consolidated to form what would be called the Township of Sussex-Wantage, which would operate within the Faulkner Act under the council-manager form of government, with a mayor and a six-member township council, and that voters in both municipalities should approve a referendum to be held on November 3, 2009. The committee noted that the two municipalities share common issues, schools, library and community services and that the artificial nature of the octagonal Sussex border often made it hard to distinguish between the two. The efforts at consolidation with surrounding Wantage Township ended in November 2009 after Wantage voters rejected the merger despite support from Sussex borough residents.

Geography
According to the U.S. Census Bureau, Sussex borough had a total area of 0.62 square miles (1.62 km2), including 0.59 square miles (1.54 km2) of land and 0.03 square miles (0.08 km2) of water (5.00%). The borough is completely surrounded by Wantage Township, making it part of 21 pairs of "doughnut towns" in the state, where one municipality entirely surrounds another.

The borough is in the watershed of the Wallkill River (which flows north, and empties into the Rondout Creek, which flows into the Hudson River near Kingston, New York) and its tributary Glen Brook, which near Sussex forms a small body of water called Clove Lake, part of which is within the borough.

Climate
Due to its inland location and elevation, Sussex has a climate much cooler than most of the state, classified as humid continental (Köppen Dfa), with cold, moderately snowy winters, and very warm, humid summers. It is part of USDA Plant Hardiness Zone 6.

Demographics

2010 census

The Census Bureau's 2006–2010 American Community Survey showed that (in 2010 inflation-adjusted dollars) median household income was $40,978 (with a margin of error of +/− $13,975) and the median family income was $53,125 (+/− $10,034). Males had a median income of $40,234 (+/− $9,777) versus $30,777 (+/− $3,942) for females. The per capita income for the borough was $20,887 (+/− $2,314). About 13.0% of families and 15.1% of the population were below the poverty line, including 22.4% of those under age 18 and 12.0% of those age 65 or over.

2000 census
As of the 2000 United States census there were 2,145 people, 903 households, and 512 families residing in the borough. The population density was 3,598 people per square mile (1,380/km2). There were 961 housing units at an average density of 1,612/sq mi (618/km2). The racial makeup of the borough was 96.32% White, 1.12% African American, 0.09% Native American, 1.21% Asian, 0.37% from other races, and 0.89% from two or more races. Hispanic or Latino of any race were 2.56% of the population.

There were 903 households, out of which 28.3% had children under the age of 18 living with them, 38.9% were married couples living together, 12.6% had a female householder with no husband present, and 43.2% were non-families. 35.1% of all households were made up of individuals, and 12.6% had someone living alone who was 65 years of age or older. The average household size was 2.36 and the average family size was 3.12.

In the borough the population was spread out, with 23.9% under the age of 18, 8.5% from 18 to 24, 32.9% from 25 to 44, 22.0% from 45 to 64, and 12.7% who were 65 years of age or older. The median age was 36 years. For every 100 females, there were 91.5 males. For every 100 females age 18 and over, there were 91.8 males.

The median income for a household in the borough was $36,172, and the median income for a family was $45,250. Males had a median income of $37,009 versus $22,475 for females. The per capita income for the borough was $18,866. About 6.9% of families and 11.0% of the population were below the poverty line, including 15.6% of those under age 18 and 8.4% of those age 65 or over.

Government

Local government
Sussex is governed under the Borough form of New Jersey municipal government, which is used in 218 municipalities (of the 564) statewide, making it the most common form of government in New Jersey. The governing body is comprised of the Mayor and the Borough Council, with all positions elected at-large on a partisan basis as part of the November general election. The Mayor is elected directly by the voters to a four-year term of office. The Borough Council is comprised of six members elected to serve three-year terms on a staggered basis, with two seats coming up for election each year in a three-year cycle. The Borough form of government used by Sussex is a "weak mayor / strong council" government in which council members act as the legislative body with the mayor presiding at meetings and voting only in the event of a tie. The mayor can veto ordinances subject to an override by a two-thirds majority vote of the council. The mayor makes committee and liaison assignments for council members, and most appointments are made by the mayor with the advice and consent of the council.

, the Mayor of Sussex Borough is Republican Edward J. Meyer, whose term of office ends on December 31, 2023. Members of the Borough Council are Council President Robert Holowach (R, 2023), Frank Dykstra (R, 2023), Charles H. Fronheiser Jr. (R, 2024), Nicholas R. Holowach (R, 2022; elected to serve an unexpired term), Jake Little (R, 2024) and Mario Poggi (R, 2022).

After the Borough Council did not vote to select any of the three candidates nominated by the Republican municipal committee, Nicholas R. Holowach was picked by the Republican group and sworn into office in June 2021 to fill the seat expiring in December 2022 that had been held by Walter Cleary III until he resigned from office to move out of the borough. In November 2021, Holowach was elected to serve the balance of the term of office.

In January 2020, the Borough Council selected Linda Masson from a list of three candidates nominated by the Republican municipal committee to fill the seat expiring in December 2021 that was vacated by Edward Meyer when he took office as mayor.

In January 2016, the council appointed Albert Decker from a list three candidates nominated by the Democratic municipal committee to fill the council seat vacated by Katherine Little expiring in December 2017 that became open when she took office as mayor; Decker served on an interim basis until the November 2016 general election, when voters selected a candidate to serve the one year remaining on the term of office.

In January 2015, the Borough Council selected Mario Poggi from three candidates nominated by the Republican municipal committee to fill the vacant seat of Bruce D. LaBar, who resigned from office earlier that month. In the November 2015 general election, Frank Dykstra was chosen to fill the balance of the seat expiring in December 2016.

Federal, state and county representation
Sussex Borough is located in the 5th Congressional District and is part of New Jersey's 24th state legislative district.

 

Sussex County is governed by a Board of County Commissioners whose five members are elected at-large in partisan elections on a staggered basis, with either one or two seats coming up for election each year. At an annual reorganization meeting held in the beginning of January, the board selects a Commissioner Director and Deputy Director from among its members, with day-to-day supervision of the operation of the county delegated to a County Administrator. , Sussex County's Commissioners are 
Commissioner Director Anthony Fasano (R, Hopatcong, term as commissioner and as commissioner director ends December 31, 2022), 
Deputy Director Chris Carney (R, Frankford Township, term as commissioner ends 2024; term as deputy director ends 2022), 
Dawn Fantasia (R, Franklin, 2024), 
Jill Space (R, Wantage Township, 2022; appointed to serve an unexpired term) and 
Herbert Yardley (R, Stillwater Township, 2023). In May 2022, Jill Space was appointed to fill the seat expiring in December 2022 that had been held by Sylvia Petillo until she resigned from office.

Constitutional officers elected on a countywide basis are 
County Clerk Jeffrey M. Parrott (R, Wantage Township, 2026),
Sheriff Michael F. Strada (R, Hampton Township, 2022) and 
Surrogate Gary R. Chiusano (R, Frankford Township, 2023). The County Administrator is Gregory V. Poff II, whose appointment expires in 2025.

Politics
As of March 2011, there were a total of 1,143 registered voters in Sussex, of which 193 (16.9% vs. 16.5% countywide) were registered as Democrats, 428 (37.4% vs. 39.3%) were registered as Republicans and 521 (45.6% vs. 44.1%) were registered as Unaffiliated. There was one voter registered to another party. Among the borough's 2010 Census population, 53.7% (vs. 65.8% in Sussex County) were registered to vote, including 69.5% of those ages 18 and over (vs. 86.5% countywide).

In the 2012 presidential election, Republican Mitt Romney received 391 votes (57.8% vs. 59.4% countywide), ahead of Democrat Barack Obama with 270 votes (39.9% vs. 38.2%) and other candidates with 16 votes (2.4% vs. 2.1%), among the 677 ballots cast by the borough's 1,146 registered voters, for a turnout of 59.1% (vs. 68.3% in Sussex County). In the 2008 presidential election, Republican John McCain received 427 votes (57.1% vs. 59.2% countywide), ahead of Democrat Barack Obama with 299 votes (40.0% vs. 38.7%) and other candidates with 18 votes (2.4% vs. 1.5%), among the 748 ballots cast by the borough's 1,109 registered voters, for a turnout of 67.4% (vs. 76.9% in Sussex County). In the 2004 presidential election, Republican George W. Bush received 456 votes (62.0% vs. 63.9% countywide), ahead of Democrat John Kerry with 263 votes (35.7% vs. 34.4%) and other candidates with 16 votes (2.2% vs. 1.3%), among the 736 ballots cast by the borough's 1,091 registered voters, for a turnout of 67.5% (vs. 77.7% in the whole county).

In the 2013 gubernatorial election, Republican Chris Christie received 70.8% of the vote (276 cast), ahead of Democrat Barbara Buono with 25.4% (99 votes), and other candidates with 3.8% (15 votes), among the 397 ballots cast by the borough's 1,148 registered voters (7 ballots were spoiled), for a turnout of 34.6%. In the 2009 gubernatorial election, Republican Chris Christie received 291 votes (56.8% vs. 63.3% countywide), ahead of Democrat Jon Corzine with 140 votes (27.3% vs. 25.7%), Independent Chris Daggett with 59 votes (11.5% vs. 9.1%) and other candidates with 16 votes (3.1% vs. 1.3%), among the 512 ballots cast by the borough's 1,109 registered voters, yielding a 46.2% turnout (vs. 52.3% in the county).

Education
Students in public school for kindergarten through eighth grade attend the Sussex-Wantage Regional School District, together with students from Wantage Township. As of the 2019–20 school year, the district, comprised of three schools, had an enrollment of 1,049 students and 99.0 classroom teachers (on an FTE basis), for a student–teacher ratio of 10.6:1. Schools in the district (with 2019–20 enrollment data from the National Center for Education Statistics) are 
Clifton E. Lawrence School in Wantage, with 376 students in grades K–2, 
Wantage Elementary School in Wantage, with 340 students in grades 3–5 and
Sussex Middle School in Sussex, with 328 students in grades 6–8.

For ninth through twelfth grades, public school students from both Sussex and Wantage attend High Point Regional High School, together with students from Branchville, Frankford Township, Lafayette Township and Montague Township. As of the 2019–20 school year, the high school had an enrollment of 866 students and 76.9 classroom teachers (on an FTE basis), for a student–teacher ratio of 11.3:1. Seats on the high school district's nine-member board of education are allocated based on the population of the constituent municipalities, with two seats assigned to Sussex.

Sussex Christian School is an inter-denominational Christian private day school that was founded in 1958 by members of the Sussex Christian Reformed Church, and which serves students from Northern New Jersey and the surrounding communities in New York and Pennsylvania.

Transportation

Roads and highways

Sussex is located at the intersection of Route 23 and Route 284.

Public transportation
Local bus service is provided by the Skylands Connect bus, which provides service to Hamburg, Sparta, and Newton.

Notable people

People who were born in, residents of, or otherwise closely associated with Sussex include:
 Grant Decker (1814–1890), first mayor of Flint, Michigan
 Paul W. Downs (born 1982), Emmy-Award winning American actor, writer, and director best known for his portrayal of Trey Pucker on the Comedy Central series Broad City
 D. C. Fontana (1939–2019), television script writer and story editor, best known for her work on the original Star Trek franchise and several western television series
 Bill Glynn (1925–2013), Major League Baseball first baseman who played four seasons of professional baseball for the Cleveland Indians and the Philadelphia Phillies
 William Alexander Linn (1846–1917), journalist and historian
 Homer Mensch (1914–2005), classical bassist

References

External links

 Official Sussex website
 Sussex Borough property, hazard, and crime stats at PogoData

 
1891 establishments in New Jersey
Borough form of New Jersey government
Boroughs in Sussex County, New Jersey
Papakating Creek watershed
Populated places established in 1891